Jeronimas Milius (born 11 October 1984 in Vilnius, Lithuania) is a Lithuanian singer. Since 2003, he has been the leader of the heavy/power metal band Soul Stealer (formerly Soul Brothers).

Career
Milius was elected to represent his country in the Eurovision Song Contest 2008 on 2 February 2008 collecting 11 674 votes leaving Aistė Pilvelytė with Troy on Fire close behind whose backing vocalist he was in the national final for Eurovision Song Contest 2006. With his opera-like rock ballad "Nomads in the Night" he didn't make it to the final ending his performance in the semi-final.

He appeared on the UK talent show 'Superstar', a search by Andrew Lloyd Webber to find the next 'Jesus' in his new arena production of Jesus Christ Superstar.

See also
Lithuania in the Eurovision Song Contest 2008

References
 . About Jeronimas Milius. Eurovision Official Website.

External links

1984 births
Living people
21st-century Lithuanian male singers
Eurovision Song Contest entrants for Lithuania
Eurovision Song Contest entrants of 2008
Heavy metal singers
Musicians from Vilnius
English-language singers from Lithuania